"Go Away" is a song by the American rock band Weezer. It was released as a promotional single from their ninth studio album Everything Will Be Alright in the End on July 24, 2015, along with a music video. The song has mostly been positively received, being compared to Weezer's older work.

Composition
"Go Away" features vocals from Bethany Cosentino of Best Coast fame. The song contains fuzzy chords, a 1960s-influenced pop melody, grunge-influenced guitars and a doo-wop chord progression. The song's genre has been described as alternative rock, garage rock, and power pop.

Critical reception
Stephen Thomas Erlewine at AllMusic and Mische Pearlman from NME considers "Go Away" to be the highlight track from Everything Will Be Alright in the End. Similar to the album's fellow single Back to the Shack, Colin Stutz of Spin praised the song as being "catchy and familiar [to Weezer's older material]." Andrew Unterberger opined in Spin "Their voices sound spectacular together, and the two do a credible job of maintaining a "Sometimes Always"-type push-pull dynamic over sunsoaked guitars and Patrick Wilson’s wave-crashing drums." At PopMatters, Evan Sawdy stated "it feels like [Rivers Cuomo] in his comfort zone: solid-but-not-extraordinary hooks, semi-predictable lyrics, but an overall sense of fun that doesn’t feel as forced as it did on Raditude or Hurley." in regards of the song. By contrast, Paste writer Tyler Kane compared it to Weezer's more recent material, describing it as having "over-glossy approach" and "over-thought" lyrics.

Music video

A music video for "Go Away" was released on July 24, 2015. It was directed by Brendan Walter and Greg Yagolnitzer, and produced by Green Glow Films.

The video sees lead vocalist Cuomo as a man trying to win the love of a woman, played by Cosentino. Cuomo attempts posing as several different personas, using the dating app "Winder" (a parody of Tinder), in order to do so. While these attempts aren't successful, Cuomo finally impresses Cosentino after saving her purse from a purse snatcher, played by Patrick Wilson, who stole it solely to help Cuomo.

References

2015 singles
2014 songs
Republic Records singles
Song recordings produced by Ric Ocasek
Songs written by Rivers Cuomo
Weezer songs